Frederic Lloyd, OBE (1 July 1918 – 27 July 1995), was an English theatre manager.  Most notably, Lloyd was the General Manager of the D'Oyly Carte Opera Company from 1951 until its closure in 1982.

Biography
Lloyd was born into an ecclesiastical family near Oxford, England. During the Second World War he worked with the Council for the Encouragement of Music and the Arts, the precursor of the Arts Council.

In 1951 he was a director of the Festival of Britain, and in September of that year he was appointed General Manager of the D'Oyly Carte Opera Company and of the Savoy Theatre, in succession to Alfred Nightingale. In addition to his D'Oyly Carte duties, Lloyd was a member of the council of management of the Royal Philharmonic Orchestra and played an important part in saving the orchestra's tour of America in 1963 at a critical time in the RPO's fortunes.  From 1961 to 1982, Lloyd was also secretary of the D'Oyly Carte Opera Trust. In 1966 he was elected President of the Theatrical Managers' Association.

With D'Oyly Carte's closure, Lloyd retired from theatre management, although he continued to sit on numerous committees. He was chairman of the governors of the Royal Academy of Music, 1980–83, and trustee and chairman of the general committee of the Garrick Club, 1976-84.  He wrote articles on Elgar and Beethoven, and he collaborated with Robin Wilson on an official history of the D'Oyly Carte Company in 1984.

On his retirement, he moved from his London home in St John's Wood to the village of Strathpeffer, Scotland, near Inverness, where he became a lay-preacher at his local church.  His wife Valerie died in 1991. They had two sons.

Lloyd died in Inverness at age 77.

Notes

References
Reid, Charles (1968). Malcolm Sargent: a biography. London: Hamish Hamilton Ltd.  
Rollins, Cyril; R. John Witts (1961). The D'Oyly Carte Opera Company in Gilbert and Sullivan Operas. London: Michael Joseph.
Wilson, Robin; Frederic Lloyd (1984). Gilbert & Sullivan: The D'Oyly Carte Years - The Official Picture History. London: Weidenfeld and Nicolson. 

Opera in the United Kingdom
English theatre managers and producers
People associated with Gilbert and Sullivan
1918 births
1995 deaths
20th-century English businesspeople